Oxford was an electoral district of the Legislative Assembly of the Parliament of the Province of Canada, in Canada West (now Ontario). It was created in 1841, upon the establishment of the Province of Canada by the union of Upper Canada and Lower Canada. Oxford was represented by one member in the Legislative Assembly.  It was split into two ridings in the redistribution of 1853.

Boundaries 

Oxford electoral district was based on Oxford County, west of what is now Toronto and inland from Lake Erie, on the Ontario Peninsula.  Woodstock was the county seat and major centre.

The Union Act, 1840 had merged the two provinces of Upper Canada and Lower Canada into the Province of Canada, with a single Parliament.  The separate parliaments of Lower Canada and Upper Canada were abolished.Union Act, 1840, 3 & 4 Vict. (UK), c. 35, s. 2.  However, the Union Act provided that the pre-existing electoral boundaries of Upper Canada would continue to be used in the new Parliament, unless altered by the Union Act itself.

Oxford County had been an electoral district in the Legislative Assembly of Upper Canada.  Its boundaries were not altered by the Union Act. Those boundaries had originally been set by a statute of Upper Canada in 1798:

Since Oxford electoral district was not changed by the Union Act, those boundaries continued to be used for the new electoral district. Oxford was represented by one member in the Legislative Assembly.

Members of the Legislative Assembly 

Oxford was represented by one member in the Legislative Assembly. The following were the members for Oxford.

Abolition 

Oxford electoral district was split into two separate ridings in the redistribution of 1853:  Oxford North and Oxford South.

References 

Electoral districts of Canada West